The following is a list of people executed by the U.S. state of Texas between 1870 and 1879. During this period 50 people were executed by hanging.

Executions 1870–1879

See also
Capital punishment in Texas

References

1870
19th-century executions by Texas
1870s-related lists
1870s in Texas